Joe Blade is the title of a series of budget-price platform games written by Colin Swinbourne and published by Players. All three titles were flick-screen adventures, in which the player controls the title character through a number of rooms, dispatching enemies and rescuing innocent people. The manner of this varies between the three games.

Joe Blade

The first Joe Blade title portrayed Blade as a lone commando sent into an evil mastermind's complex to release a number of diplomats. It reached the top of the UK game charts, replacing Renegade. In Germany, the game peaked at number 7.

Joe Blade 2

Joe Blade 2 took a rather different approach to the first game. Instead of being a soldier, Blade was this time a vigilante taking to the city to rid the streets of criminals, rescuing old-age pensioners along the way. Blade was no longer armed with a gun, and had to jump over villains, just touching them with his feet, to dispatch them. In order for the civilians to be successfully rescued, the protagonist was given a simple puzzle (called a sub-game level) of organizing the pattern of symbols. There were four types of these sub-games and all of them needed to be completed within 60 seconds. This almost surreal take on the game was in stark contrast to the comparatively more gritty realism of the first installment. The game was also known for being considerably easier than the first title, almost to the point where many players managed to complete the game in one hour-long sitting. The game reached the top of the UK budget games chart in late 1988.

The Spectrum version of the game featured a version of Invade-a-Load featuring Pac Man.

Joe Blade 3

Joe Blade 3 returned to the first title's formula, arming Blade with a machine gun. Exclusively released for the ZX Spectrum and Amstrad CPC, it included Commodore 64 instructions in its inlay, but no Commodore 64 version was ever released.

Legacy
A 1991 Players game, Prison Riot plays very similarly to the Joe Blade titles and a hacked version that identifies itself as Joe Blade 4 has been distributed on the internet.

References

External links
 Joe Blade 2 Review from CRASH
 Joe Blade Review from Your Sinclair
 Atari 8-bit fan review of Joe Blade

Maps
 Complete map of Joe Blade
 Complete map of Joe Blade 2
 Complete map of Joe Blade 3
 Complete map of Joe Blade (Atari 8-bit version)
 Complete map of Joe Blade 2 (Atari 8-bit version)

1987 video games
1988 video games
1989 video games
ZX Spectrum games
Joe Blade 2
Commodore 64 games
Amstrad CPC games
Amiga games
Atari ST games
MSX games
BBC Micro and Acorn Electron games
Atari 8-bit family games
Video games developed in the United Kingdom